Attila Bátky (born January 23, 1973) is an amateur Slovak Greco-Roman wrestler, who played for the men's light heavyweight category. He won a bronze medal for his division at the 2003 World Wrestling Championships in Créteil, France, earning him a spot on the Slovak wrestling team for the Olympics. Batky is a member of the wrestling team for ASK Dukla Trenčín, and is coached and trained by Petr Hirjak.

Batky made his official debut for the 2004 Summer Olympics in Athens, where he placed third in the preliminary pool of the men's 84 kg class, against Sweden's Ara Abrahamian, Japan's Shingo Matsumoto, and Kyrgyzstan's Janarbek Kenjeev.

At the 2008 Summer Olympics in Beijing, Batky competed for the second time in the men's 84 kg class. He lost the qualifying round match to Cuba's Yunior Estrada, who was able to score nine points in two straight periods, leaving Batky without a single point.

References

External links
NBC Olympics Profile
 

Slovak male sport wrestlers
1973 births
Living people
Olympic wrestlers of Slovakia
Wrestlers at the 2004 Summer Olympics
Wrestlers at the 2008 Summer Olympics
Sportspeople from Dunajská Streda
Hungarians in Slovakia
World Wrestling Championships medalists